Hambarakapet (meaning "overseer-of-stores, quartermaster") was a high-ranking Sasanian office which was equivalent to the office of quartermaster.

Sources 
 
 

Positions of authority
Sasanian administrative offices